Harry Scott Conklin (born October 7, 1958) is an American politician serving as a Democratic member of the Pennsylvania House of Representatives for the 77th legislative district. He was first elected in 2006. Conklin is a Rush Township resident and has been married to his wife, Terri, since 1984. They have one son, Spencer, who was born in 1987. He was the democratic nominee for Lieutenant Governor of Pennsylvania in 2010, losing by a ten percent margin.

Early life
Scott was born in 1958 in Philipsburg, Centre County, Pennsylvania. He graduated from Philipsburg-Osceola High School in 1977, and Clearfield County Vocational Technical School. Prior to elective office, Conklin owned a carpentry business from 1989 through 2007 and now owns Conklin's Corner Antique Mall. Before being elected to the state House in 2006, Conklin served as Centre County Commissioner for seven years. During his tenure as commissioner, he served as board chairman and chairman of the Salary Board, Retirement Board, Employee Benefits Trust, and Board of Assessment.

Commissioner and candidate
He served as commissioner for Centre County from 1999 to 2006. He was the Democratic candidate for Pennsylvania's 9th congressional district in a 2001 special election, eventually losing to Bill Shuster.

Candidacy for Lieutenant Governor

Conklin won the May primary election to become the Democratic nominee for lieutenant governor. He joined Allegheny County Chief Executive Dan Onorato on the Democratic ticket. Onorato and Conklin lost the November general election to the Republican ticket of State Attorney General Tom Corbett and Bucks County Commissioner Jim Cawley.

Candidacy for Auditor General
On January 6, 2020, Conklin announced his candidacy for Pennsylvania Auditor General, becoming the sixth Democrat to enter the race. Despite being perceived as having high name recognition, he ultimately placed fifth in the Democratic primary.

Political career 
Conklin currently serves as the Democratic Chair of the House State Government Committee.

References

External links

Pennsylvania House of Representatives - H. Scott Conklin  official PA House website
Pennsylvania House Democratic Caucus - H. Scott Conklin  official caucus website
Lieutenant Governor Campaign '''official campaign website

|-

1958 births
Candidates in the 2010 United States elections
21st-century American politicians
Living people
Democratic Party members of the Pennsylvania House of Representatives
People from Philipsburg, Centre County, Pennsylvania